(Law French for "hard and forceful punishment") was a method of torture formerly used in the common law legal system, in which a defendant who refused to plead ("stood mute") would be subjected to having heavier and heavier stones placed upon his or her chest until a plea was entered, or death resulted. 

Many defendants charged with capital offences would refuse to plead in order to avoid forfeiture of property. If the defendant pleaded either guilty or not guilty and was executed, their heirs would inherit nothing, their property escheating to the State. If they refused to plead their heirs would inherit their estate, even if they died in the process.

Legal background

The common law courts originally took a very limited view of their own jurisdiction. They considered themselves to lack jurisdiction over a defendant until he had voluntarily submitted to it by entering a plea seeking judgment from the court. Obviously, a criminal justice system that could punish only those who had volunteered for possible punishment was unworkable; a means was needed to coerce them into entering a plea. Alternatively, individuals were frequently tried under Admiralty law, as observed by Henry de Bracton.

The "Standing Mute Act 1275", part of Statute of Westminster of 1275 of Edward I of England, states:

It appears to have initially meant imprisonment under harsh conditions:

By the reign of Elizabeth I it took the form of "pressing" the accused with weights. 
 
The procedure was recorded by a 15th-century witness as follows:

"Pressing to death" might take several days, and not necessarily with a continued increase in the load. The Frenchman Guy Miege, who from 1668 taught languages in London, says the following about the English practice:

 was abolished in the Kingdom of Great Britain in 1772, with the last known actual use of the practice having been in 1741. From 1772 refusing to plead was deemed to be equivalent to pleading guilty, but this was changed in 1827 to being deemed a plea of not guilty – which is now the case in all common law jurisdictions.

Cases

The most infamous case in England was that of Roman Catholic martyr St. Margaret Clitherow, who (in order to avoid a trial in which her own children would be obliged to give evidence and could be tortured) was pressed to death on 25 March 1586, after refusing to plead to the charge of having harboured Catholic priests in her house. She died together with her unborn child within fifteen minutes under a weight of at least 7 cwt. Others, such as Major Strangways (1658) and John Weekes (1731), refused to plead, even under , and were killed when bystanders, out of mercy, sat on them.

In America, Giles Corey was pressed to death between 17 and 19 September 1692, during the Salem witch trials, after he refused to enter a plea in the judicial proceeding. According to legend, his last words as he was being crushed were "More weight", and he was thought to have been killed as the weight was applied. This is referred to in Arthur Miller's political drama The Crucible, where Giles Corey is pressed to death after refusing to plead "aye or nay" to the charge of witchcraft. In the film version of this play, the screenplay of which was also by Miller, Corey is crushed to death for refusing to reveal the name of a source of information.

See also
Asphyxia
Crush syndrome
Crushing (execution)

References

Further reading
McKenzie, Andrea. "'This Death Some Strong and Stout Hearted Man Doth Choose': The Practice of Peine Forte et Dure in Seventeenth- and Eighteenth-Century England". Law and History Review, Summer 2005, Vol. 23, No. 2, pp. 279–313.

External links
 Forfeiture in England and Colonial America
  The Proceedings of the Old Bailey, Reference Number: t16760823-6 (23 August 1676)

Common law
Pleas
Torture